The France under 20 rugby team are the newest representative rugby union team from France. They replace the two former age grade teams Under 19s and Under 21s. Their first tournament was the 2008 Six Nations U20 Championship, where they finished 3rd with three wins (over Scotland, Ireland and Italy) and two losses (to England and Wales). They also have participated in the inaugural IRB Junior World Championship and all subsequent competitions. They won the Six Nations Under 20s Championship in 2009, 2014, and 2018, when they also won World Rugby Under 20 Championship (2018, 2019).

U20 Six Nations Championship
The France Under 20s won three of their five matches and finished 3rd in the 2008 Six Nations Championship.

The France Under 20s won four of their five matches to be crowned champions in the 2009 Six Nations Championship.

The France Under 20s won two of their five matches and finished 4th in the 2010 Six Nations Championship.

The France Under 20s won four of their five matches and were the runners-up in the 2011 Six Nations Championship.

The France Under 20s won four of their five matches and were the runners-up in the 2012 Six Nations Championship.

The France Under 20s won two of their five matches and finished 4th in the 2013 Six Nations Championship.

Junior World Championship

The France Under 20s ended up 6th in the 2008 Junior World Championship.

The France Under 20s ended up 5th in the 2009 Junior World Championship.

The France Under 20s ended up 5th in the 2010 Junior World Championship.

The France Under 20s ended up 4th in the 2011 Junior World Championship.

The France Under 20s ended up 6th in the 2012 Junior World Championship.

The France Under 20s ended up 5th in the 2013 Junior World Championship.

The France Under 20s ended up 6th in the 2014 Junior World Championship.

The France Under 20s ended up 4th in the 2015 Under 20 Championship.

The France Under 20s ended up 9th in the 2016 Under 20 Championship.

The France Under 20s ended up 4th in the 2017 Under 20 Championship.

The France Under 20s ended up Champions of the 2018 Under 20 Championship.

The France Under 20s ended up Champions of the 2019 Under 20 Championship.

Current squad

Squad for the 2018 World Rugby Under 20 Championship:

 Pierre-Henri Azagoh (RC Massy)
 Demba Bamba (CA Brive)
 Pierre-Louis Barassi (Lyon OU)
 Giorgi Beria (ASM Clermont Auvergne)
 Antonin Berruyer (FC Grenoble)
 Ugo Boniface (Aviron Bayonnais)
 Daniel Brennan (Stade Toulousain)
 Louis Carbonel (RC Toulonnais)
 Arthur Coville (Stade Français) (Captain)
 Ibrahim Diallo (Racing 92)
 Iban Etcheverry (Union Bordeaux Bègles)
 Charlie Francoz (Stade Français)
 Killian Geraci (FC Grenoble)
 Jules Gimbert (Union Bordeaux Bègles)
 Jean-Baptiste Gros (RC Toulonnais)
 Jordan Joseph (Racing 92)
 Hassane Kolingar (Racing 92)
 Maxime Lamothe (Union Bordeaux Bègles)
 Clément Laporte (SU Agen Lot-et-Garonne)
 Thomas Lavault (Stade Rochelais)
 Matthis Lebel (Stade Toulousain)
 Guillaume Marchand (Stade Toulousain)
 Maxime Marty (Stade Toulousain)
 Romain Ntamack (Stade Toulousain)
 Alban Roussel (USA Perpignan)
 Adrien Seguret (Lyon OU)
 Lucas Tauzin (Stade Toulousain)
 Arthur Vincent (Montpellier Hérault Rugby)
 Cameron Woki (Union Bordeaux Bègles)
 Sacha Zegueur (US Oyonnax)

Management and staff

 Patrick Fort - Head of delegation
 Jean-Marc Béderède - Head coach
 Sébastien Bruno - Forwards coach
 Sylvain Bouthier - Backs coach
 Philippe Boher - Defense coach
 Gaëtan Boissard - Fitness coach
 Bertrand Mathieu - Fitness coach
 Yannick Castanet - Doctor
 Jean-François Surrault - Doctor
 Florian Mirande - Physiotherapist
 Joanna Sainlo - Physiotherapist
 Mathieu Vidalin - Physiotherapist
 James Kent - Video Analyst
 Élise Macarie - Operational manager
 Jean-Claude Muesser - Kit manager

References

Under20
European national under-20 rugby union teams